Lyndhurst is an unincorporated community located in the town of Herman, Shawano County, Wisconsin, United States. The Mountain-Bay State Trail runs through Lyndhurst.

References

Unincorporated communities in Shawano County, Wisconsin
Unincorporated communities in Wisconsin